Sened is an extinct East Zenati Berber language that was spoken in the nearby towns of Sened and Majoura (Berber Tmagurt) in southern Tunisia until the mid-20th century. In 1911, the whole town of Sened spoke Berber; by 1968, only the elderly did.

Sample

From a section translated from the epic Taghribat Bani Hilal, detailing the incursion of the Banu Hilal, in Provotelle's Etude sur la Tamazir't ou Zenatia de Qalaât Es-sned (Tunisie) (1911). The Arabic and French transcriptions of the text are reproduced unchanged; in the latter, r' represents a voiced uvular fricative, kh a voiceless uvular fricative, ch represents English sh, ou represents /u/ or /w/, i represents /i/ or /j/, and e represents schwa.

References

External links
Tamazight in Tunisia: by Ahmed Boukous (Internet Archive)

Berber languages
Berbers in Tunisia
Extinct languages of Africa
Languages of Tunisia
Languages extinct in the 20th century